Mount Columbia is a mountain located in the Winston Churchill Range of the Rocky Mountains. It is the highest point in Alberta, Canada, and is second only to Mount Robson for height and topographical prominence in the Canadian Rockies. It is located on the border between Alberta and British Columbia on the northern edge of the Columbia Icefield. Its highest point, however, lies within Jasper National Park in Alberta.

The mountain was named in 1898 by J. Norman Collie after the Columbia River. 
The river itself was named after the American ship Columbia Rediviva  captained by Robert Gray, who first ventured over a dangerous sandbar and explored the lower reaches of the river in 1792. 
Mount Columbia was first ascended in 1902 by James Outram, guided by Christian Kaufmann.


Climbing routes 

The normal route is on the east face, a non-technical glacier climb that is straightforward in summer, albeit with a long approach (approx. ) up the Athabasca Glacier and over the Columbia Icefield. Other routes include the North Ridge, which is more technical (Grade V, YDS 5.7, W3) but considered more spectacular.

Geology

Mount Columbia is composed of sedimentary rock laid down from the Precambrian to Jurassic periods. Formed in shallow seas, this sedimentary rock was pushed east and over the top of younger rock during the Laramide orogeny.

Climate

Based on the Köppen climate classification, Mount Columbia is located in a subarctic climate with cold, snowy winters, and mild summers. Temperatures can drop below -20 °C with wind chill factors below -30 °C.

See also

List of mountains of Alberta
List of mountains of British Columbia
List of mountains in the Canadian Rockies
List of highest points of Canadian provinces and territories
Mountain peaks of North America
Mountain peaks of the Rocky Mountains

References

Gallery

External links 

Canadian Rockies
Mountains of Jasper National Park
Three-thousanders of Alberta
Three-thousanders of British Columbia
Winston Churchill Range
Borders of British Columbia
Borders of Alberta